Ismagilovo (İsmäğil) is a rural locality (a selo) in Kazangulovsky Selsoviet, Davlekanovsky District, Bashkortostan, Russia. The population was 150 as of 2010. There are 2 streets.

Geography 
Ismagilovo is located 9 km northeast of Davlekanovo (the district's administrative centre) by road. Bishkain is the nearest rural locality.

References 

Rural localities in Davlekanovsky District